The Virginia Department of Motor Vehicles (Virginia DMV) is the governmental agency responsible for registering and titling automobiles and other motor vehicles as well as licensing drivers in the Commonwealth of Virginia.

Motor vehicle registration
The Virginia Department of Motor Vehicles (Virginia DMV) serves a customer base of approximately 423,000 ID card holders and 6 million licensed drivers with over 7.5 million registered vehicles in Virginia. Virginia DMV has more daily face-to-face contact with Virginia's citizens than any other state agency. The agency also serves a wide array of businesses including dealers, fuels tax customers, rental companies, driving schools, other state agencies, local governments and non-profit organizations.

Through the headquarters in Richmond, Virginia DMV operates customer service centers, call centers, weigh stations, DMV Selects and mobile visits known as DMV Connect. Virginia DMV also provides service by Internet, automated telephone and mail. Customers can also reach Virginia DMV through social media on its Facebook, Twitter and Instagram pages.

More than 50 services, including address updates and vehicle registration renewals, are available on DMV's Online Services page without visiting one of 75 customer service centers throughout the state.

Driver licensing
All data is based on fiscal year 2022 (July 2021 – June 2022) unless otherwise indicated. 
As of 2022, Virginia DMV has:

Highway Safety data is based on calendar year 2021.

References

External links
DMV Homepage

Transportation in Virginia
Motor vehicle registration agencies
Department of Motor Vehicles